The Panther–Wotan line, or Ostwall in German, was a defensive line partially built by the German Wehrmacht in 1943 on the Eastern Front. The first part of the name refers to the short northern section between Lake Peipus and the Baltic Sea at Narva. It stretched all the way south towards the Black Sea along the Dnieper.

Planning
After a number of strategic reverses on the Eastern Front in 1942, there were calls in early 1943 for the construction of fortifications and defenses-in-depth along the Dnieper river. After the Battle of Kursk and the invasion of Italy, the need arose to both conserve forces in the east as well as shift to defensive operations. Adolf Hitler ordered the construction of the defensive lines in August 1943; with this command, he demonstrated that he had accepted the fact that Nazi Germany was no longer capable of offensive operations in the east.

A large portion of the line ran along the Dnieper River, from just west of Smolensk to the Black Sea. The line left the banks of the Dnieper only where another major tributary offered similar defensive capabilities. In the south, where the Dnieper curved (western Dnipropetrovsk Oblast) to the west, it was decided to construct the line east of the Dnieper in order to avoid the evacuation or isolation of the Crimea.

When the order was signed for its construction on 11 August 1943, the Wehrmacht held positions sometimes hundreds of kilometers to the east of the proposed defensive line, generally along the Donets River in the south and along a line roughly from Smolensk to Leningrad in the north.

Defensive operations
The confidence in the effectiveness of the line was poor in Army Group North, with its commander, General Georg von Küchler, refusing to refer to the line by the "Panther Line" name for fear that it would instill false hope by his troops in its strength. Construction had barely started when Manstein's Army Group South commenced to fall back on it as part of a general withdrawal ordered on 15 September 1943.

The Red Army immediately attempted to break the line to deny the OKH time to plan a long-term defence. It launched the Lower Dnieper strategic offensive operation along a 300 km front. The line was particularly weak in the area just north of the Black Sea where it departed from the Dnieper to cover the approaches to the Crimea. The Soviet Southern Front breached the barely constructed fortified line with relative ease, thereby cutting off the German 17th Army on the Crimean Peninsula from its land retreat route. The Red Army casualties were 173,201 unrecoverable and 581,191 sick and wounded (total 754,392).

The fighting afterward involved the gradual establishment of multiple Soviet bridgeheads across the Dnieper. While the crossing operations of the Dnieper were difficult, the Wehrmacht was unable to dislodge the Red Army from its positions once across the river. The bridgeheads and the Soviet forces deployed in them grew. By late December 1943, Kiev had been taken by the Red Army and broke the line along the Dnieper, forcing a Wehrmacht retreat toward the 1939 Polish border.

The only part of the line to remain in Wehrmacht possession after 1943 was the extreme northern section, the Panther line between Lake Peipus and the Baltic Sea at Narva. The small portion of the line was assaulted during the Battle of Narva, with the Baltic States and the Gulf of Finland remaining in German hands well into 1944.

The defensive positions along the Dnieper were able to slow but not to stop the Soviet advance. The river was a considerable barrier, but the length of the line made it difficult to defend. The inability of the Germans to roll back the Soviet bridgeheads after they were established meant that the line could not be held.

See also 
 Battle of Smolensk (1943)

References

Notes

Bibliography 

German World War II defensive lines
Military installations of the Wehrmacht
World War II sites in Estonia
World War II sites in Ukraine
World War II sites in Russia
World War II sites in Belarus